Immortal Sergeant is a 1942 war novel by the British writer John Brophy. The novel is set during the North African campaign of the Second World War and seen through the eyes of a British corporal fighting across the Libyan desert whose comrade, a sergeant, is killed.

Film adaptation
In 1943 it was adapted into a Hollywood film Immortal Sergeant directed by John M. Stahl and starring Henry Fonda, Maureen O'Hara and Thomas Mitchell. The plot was then recycled for a 1951 film Fixed Bayonets! about American troops set during the Korean War.

References

Bibliography
 Goble, Alan. The Complete Index to Literary Sources in Film. Walter de Gruyter, 1999.
 Watson, George & Willison, Ian R. The New Cambridge Bibliography of English Literature, Volume 4. CUP, 1972.

1942 British novels
British war novels
British novels adapted into films
William Collins, Sons books
Novels by John Brophy
Novels set in Libya
Novels set during World War II